John Bourchier, 1st Earl of Bath (20 July 1470 – 30 April 1539) was named Earl of Bath in 1536. He was feudal baron of Bampton in Devon.

Origins
John Bourchier was born in Essex, England,  the eldest son and heir of Fulk Bourchier, 10th Baron FitzWarin (d. 18 September 1479) by his wife Elizabeth Dynham, 2nd daughter and co-heiress of John Dynham, 6th Baron Dynham. He was the brother of Elizabeth Bourchier.

Marriages
Bourchier married three times:
Firstly to Cecily Daubeny, the daughter of Giles Daubeny, 8th Baron Daubeny and Elizabeth Arundell, the daughter of John Arundell of Lanherne, Cornwall. They had eight children.
Secondly to Florence Bonville, widow of Sir Humphrey Fulford, and daughter and coheir of John Bonville by Katharine Wingfield, the daughter of Sir Robert Wingfield. 
Thirdly to Elizabeth Wentworth, widow of Sir Roger Darcy (d. 30 September 1508) and Sir Thomas Wyndham, and daughter of Sir Henry Wentworth of Nettlestead, Suffolk, by Anne Say, the daughter of Sir John Say.

Children
 
By his 1st wife Cecily Daubeny, he had the following children:
John Bourchier, 2nd Earl of Bath (d.1560).
Lady Elizabeth Bourchier (d.24 August 1548), married Edward Chichester (c.1496-1522), of Raleigh, Pilton, Devon. Her monumental brass, depicting a small kneeling figure with a separate inscription, exists in St Brannock's Church, Braunton, Devon.
Amias Bourchier
Lady Dorothy Bourchier, married Sir John Fulford.
Giles Bourchier
Lady Margaret Bourchier
Lady Anne Bourchier
Lady Eleanor Bourchier

Death and burial
John Bourchier, 1st Earl of Bath was buried in Bampton Church in Devon, in which he had endowed a chantry. Although part of an elaborate chest tomb survives in the church, it is according to Pevsner that of his grandmother Thomasine Hankford (d.1453), heiress of Bampton, wife of William Bourchier, 9th Baron FitzWarin(1407-1470). The 1st Earl's tomb, which was destroyed sometime after 1770, was situated in the north aisle of Bampton Church and showed effigies of himself and his wife Cecily Daubeny with their 8 children.

Sources
 Bourchier Family Accessed 9 December 2007
 thepeerage.com  Accessed 9 December 2007

Notes

References

|-

1470 births
1539 deaths
People from Essex
1
Bourchier
John, Bath
15th-century English people
16th-century English nobility